MLB 2K13 (sometimes called Major League Baseball 2K13)  is a  Major League Baseball licensed baseball simulation video game developed by Visual Concepts and published by 2K Sports and was released on March 5, 2013 for the PlayStation 3 and Xbox 360. This is the first and only MLB 2K game not to be released on the PlayStation 2, PSP, Wii, and Nintendo DS. The commentary is delivered by the trio of Gary Thorne, Steve Phillips, and John Kruk. David Price (then of the Tampa Bay Rays) is the game's cover athlete replacing Justin Verlander from MLB 2K12.

On January 6, 2014, 2K Sports announced that MLB 2K13 would be the final game in the MLB 2K series, and MLB would not see a release on Xbox platforms until the release of MLB The Show 21, which released eight years later for the Xbox One and Xbox Series X/S, alongside the PlayStation 4 and PlayStation 5.

Features
2K confirmed that the 7 Perfect Game Challenge will be returning, but will now have many different rules.

2K confirmed for the second straight year that there will be a 2K combo pack that includes MLB 2K13 and NBA 2K13. The NBA cover will only feature Kevin Durant of the Oklahoma City Thunder on it instead of the trio of Durant, Blake Griffin of the Los Angeles Clippers, and Derrick Rose of the Chicago Bulls.
Its retail price was $79.99 and was released on March 5.

There are no gameplay or game mode additions compared to MLB 2K12, and it is missing online leagues. This is most likely because 2K only had four months to make the game due to the contract expiration.

Reception
MLB 2K13 has received negative reviews, with most reviewers saying the addition of no new modes or game play enhancements makes the game a copy and paste of MLB 2K12. IGN called the game a "phoned-in, weak sauce embarrassment."

Soundtrack

Reception 

MLB 2K13 received "generally unfavorable" reviews, according to review aggregator Metacritic.

Game Informer wrote, "MLB 2K13 is one of the most embarrassing whiffs I’ve seen. Whether I was playing CPU or human opponents, games frequently hinged on something that shouldn’t have happened on the diamond. Only play it if you have a YouTube account dedicated to archiving video game glitches."

See also

MLB 13: The Show
MLB 2K12

References

2013 video games
2K Sports games
Major League Baseball video games
PlayStation 3 games
Xbox 360 games
Sports video games set in the United States
Multiplayer and single-player video games
Take-Two Interactive games
MLB 2K
Video games developed in the United States
Video games set in Maryland